Dehui West railway station is a railway station of Hada Passenger Railway located in  Jilin, China.

Railway stations in Jilin